Avinger Independent School District is a public school district based in Avinger, Texas (USA). The district is located in southwestern Cass County and extends into a portion of Marion County.

Finances
As of the 2010–2011 school year, the appraised valuation of property in the district was $51,670,000. The maintenance tax rate was $0.117 and the bond tax rate was $0.011 per $100 of appraised valuation.

Academic achievement
In 2011, the school district was rated "recognized" by the Texas Education Agency.  Thirty-five percent of districts in Texas in 2011 received the same rating. No state accountability ratings will be given to districts in 2012. A school district in Texas can receive one of four possible rankings from the Texas Education Agency: Exemplary (the highest possible ranking), Recognized, Academically Acceptable, and Academically Unacceptable (the lowest possible ranking).

Historical district TEA accountability ratings
2011: Recognized
2010: Recognized
2009: Recognized
2008: Recognized
2007: Recognized
2006: Recognized
2005: Academically Acceptable
2004: Academically Acceptable

Schools
As of the 2011–2012 school year, the district had one school, Avinger School. From at least 2004 through 2010, there was a separate Avinger Elementary School.

Special programs

Athletics
Avinger High School participates in the boys sports of basketball and wrestling. The school participates in the girls sport of basketball. For the 2012 through 2014 school years, Avinger High School will play basketball in UIL Class 1A Division II.

See also

List of school districts in Texas
List of high schools in Texas

References

External links

School districts in Cass County, Texas
School districts in Marion County, Texas